Ashley Hamilton (born 28 September 1988) is a British professional basketball player. He plays for the Montreal Alliance of the Canadian Elite Basketball League and the Great Britain men's national team. Standing at 2.01 m (6'7"), he plays the small forward and the power forward position. After five years at Loyola Marymount University, Hamilton entered the 2013 NBA draft but was not selected.

High school career
Hamilton played high school basketball at Lawrence Academy, in Groton, Massachusetts.

College career
Hamilton started his career in Spain with Gran Canaria and Tenefe Vecindario. In 2008, he left Spain in order to play college basketball at Loyola Marymount University with the Loyola Marymount Lions. At the end of his senior season, Hamilton averaged 11.0 points, 5.6 rebounds, 0.68 steals and 0.64 assists per game in 22 games.

Professional career
After going undrafted in the 2013 NBA draft, Hamilton joined VL Pesaro of the Serie A on 20 September 2013. He was waived after one month. Then, he signed with Viola Reggio Calabria for the rest of the season.

In 2014, he signed with Cherkaski Monkeys, and at the end of the season, he joined Sagesse for the Lebanese playoffs.

On 23 September 2015, Hamilton joined Olimpia Matera. He left the club on December and joined Lavrio of the Greek Basket League.

On 4 December 2019 he signed with Básquet Coruña of the LEB Oro. He averaged 11.8 points and 5.2 rebounds per game. On September 1, 2020, he has signed with Plymouth Raiders of the British Basketball League (BBL).

On April 27, 2022, Hamilton signed a contract with the Montreal Alliance of the Canadian Elite Basketball League (CEBL).

National team career 
Hamilton made his debut for the Great Britain Men's National Team on 21 July 2010 in an international test match against Canada at ACS Cobham. He scored a career high 13 points against Kosovo in FIBA EuroBasket 2022 Pre-Qualifiers in Manchester on 17 August 2019.

References

External links
Profile at eurobasket.com
Profile at realgm.com
Profile at draftexpress.com

1988 births
Living people
London City Royals players
Basketball players from Greater London
Bàsquet Manresa players
BC Cherkaski Mavpy players
British expatriate basketball people in Spain
British expatriate basketball people in the United States
British expatriates in Greece
CB Gran Canaria players
English men's basketball players
English expatriates in the United States
Forwards (basketball)
Greek Basket League players
Lavrio B.C. players
Loyola Marymount Lions men's basketball players
Montreal Alliance players
Victoria Libertas Pallacanestro players
Viola Reggio Calabria players
Sagesse SC basketball players